A corslet is defined by the Oxford English Dictionary as "a piece of defensive armour covering the body." In ancient Egypt, Ramesses II is said to have worn a similar device in some battle(s). In Ancient Greek armies, the "hoplite", or heavy infantryman, wore a bronze corslet or known as the thorax (or a linen version known as the linothorax) to protect his upper body. The corslet consisted of two plates connected on the sides via hinges and bronze pins. By the 16th century, the corslet, also spelled corselet, was popular as a light-half-armour for general military use, e.g., by town guards. It was made up of a gorget, breast covering, back and tassets, full arms and gauntlets. 

In the 10th and 11th century AD depicts some Byzantine troops wearing a metallic corselet lamellar armour (besides the lorikion scale armour that was widely used by the Stratioti) shown in the Skylitzes and Madrid Skylitzes chronicles and of the Menologion of Basil II. There were also seen to be used by the imperial guardsmen in Constantinople. The armor itself lasted until the fall of Constantinople, as Constantinos Palaiologos himself is recorded as wearing one during the fall.

The word "corslet" was adopted as a so-called "occupational surname," later altered to Coslett, Cosslett, Coslet, etc., following the arrival of an expert in the manufacture of osmond iron, Corslet Tinkhaus, to Wales from his native Westphalia in 1567.  

According to Webster's Third New International Dictionary, corslet also refers to a soldier equipped with a corslet.

Western plate armour
Body armor